Qasimabad is a neighborhood in the Karachi Central district of Karachi, Pakistan. It was previously a part of Liaquatabad Town, which was disbanded in 2011.

References

External links 
 Karachi Website.
 Local Government Sindh.

Neighbourhoods of Karachi
Liaquatabad Town